Paratech AG was a Swiss aircraft manufacturer based in Wasserauen and previously in Appenzell. The company specialized in the design and manufacture of paragliders in the form of ready-to-fly aircraft, as well as paragliding harnesses, clothing and accessories.

The company was founded in 1988 and seems to gone out of business in 2015.

The company was an aktiengesellschaft, a stockholder owned company.

Paratech's paragliders, designed by Uwe Bernholz, had a unique model numbering system. In the early 2000s production included the beginner P25 and P26, the intermediate P43 and the performance P70, as well as the two-place 
P Bi4 for flight training.

Aircraft 

Summary of aircraft built by Paratech:
Paratech P12
Paratech P22
Paratech P25
Paratech P26
Paratech P28
Paratech P43
Paratech P45
Paratech P50
Paratech P70
Paratech P81
Paratech P Bi4
Paratech P Bi6

References

External links

Company website archives on Archive.org

Defunct aircraft manufacturers of Switzerland
Paragliders
Vehicle manufacturing companies established in 1988
Swiss companies established in 1988